Vittskövle Castle ( also Widtskövle slott) is an estate in Kristianstad Municipality, Scania, Sweden. It has one of the best-preserved Renaissance castles in the Nordic countries.

History 
During the last years of the Middle Ages, the estate  belonged to the Archbishop of Lund. The main house was  erected by Jens Brahe (ca 1500–1560) 
in the 16th century as a defence structure. It was completed in 1577. In the 18th century, the northwest tower burned and the spire was built in a romantic medieval style.  The park and gardens were mainly built by Adolf Fredrik Barnekow (1744–87). 
At the beginning of the 19th century, the castle was newly decorated with  murals and ceiling paintings by Swedish painter   Christian Laurentius Gernandt   (1765-1825).Vittskövle  has belonged to members of the Stjernswärd family since 1837.

References

Buildings and structures in Skåne County
16th-century establishments in Skåne County
Water castles